Hannah Solomon may refer to:

 Hannah G. Solomon (1858–1942), American social reformer
 Hannah Paul Solomon (1908–2011), American community leader and artist